Gary Arthur Marsh (born March 9, 1946) is a Canadian former ice hockey left winger.

Career 
Marsh played seven games in the National Hockey League with the Detroit Red Wings and Toronto Maple Leafs during the 1967–68 and 1968–69 seasons. The rest of his career, which lasted from 1966 to 1964, was spent in various minor leagues.

Career statistics

Regular season and playoffs

References 
 

1946 births
Living people
Canadian ice hockey left wingers
Detroit Red Wings players
Hamilton Red Wings (OHA) players
Fort Worth Wings players
Kansas City Blues players
Memphis Wings players
Ontario Hockey Association Senior A League (1890–1979) players
Phoenix Roadrunners (WHL) players
Rochester Americans players
Ice hockey people from Toronto
Springfield Kings players
Toronto Maple Leafs players
Tulsa Oilers (1964–1984) players